The 2006 Speedway World Cup Event 1 was the first race of the 2006 Speedway World Cup season. It took place on 16 July 2006 in the Rybnik Municipal Stadium in Rybnik, Poland.

Results

Heat details

Heat after heat 
 Sullivan, Protasiewicz, Richardson, Hautamaeki
 Stead, Nieminen, Ułamek, Schlein
 Harris, Jaguś, Adams, Laukkanen
 Crump, Hampel, Nicholls, Reima(Fx)
 Gollob, Wiltshire, Loram, Makela
 Adams, Richardson, Hampel, Makela
 Crump, Stead, Gollob, Hautamaeki
 Wiltshire, Harris, Nieminen, Protasiewicz
 Nicholls, Ułamek, Sullivan, Laukkanen
 Loram, Schlein, Jaguś, Reima
 Crump, Richardson, Jaguś, Nieminen
 Hampel, Stead, Laukkanen, Wiltshire(e2)
 Gollob, Sullivan, Harris, Reima
 Nicholls, Protasiewicz, Schlein, Makela
 Adams, Ułamek, Loram, Hautamaeki
 Richardson, Laukkanen, Gollob, Schlein
 Adams, Protasiewicz, Stead, Nieminen
 Crump, Ułamek, Harris, Makela
 Wiltshire, Nicholls, Jaguś, Hautamaeki
 Loram, Sullivan, Hampel, Nieminen
 Ułamek, Richardson, Laukkanen(joker), Wiltshire(Fx)
 Gollob(joker), Sullivan, Stead, Makela
 Hampel, Harris, Hautamaeki, Schlein
 Adams, Gollob, Nicholls, Nieminen
 Crump, Loram, Protasiewicz, Laukkanen

References

See also 
 2006 Speedway World Cup
 motorcycle speedway

E1